Patrick Staropoli (born November 10, 1989) is an American ophthalmologist and professional stock car racing driver. He last competed part-time in the NASCAR Camping World Truck Series, driving the No. 07 for Young's Motorsports in a partnership with SS-Green Light Racing.

Racing career
A Jeff Gordon fan as a child, Staropoli began kart racing at the age of 13 with the support of his father Nick, a mechanic who raced at the defunct Hialeah Speedway. Moving through series, he started late model racing in 2010.

In 2013, he won the Peak Stock Car Dream Challenge, a reality television program in which the winner joined Michael Waltrip Racing's driver development program. Along with runner-up Chase Briscoe, Staropoli raced for Bill McAnally Racing in the NASCAR K&N Pro Series West, finishing fifth in his debut at Spokane County Raceway. The following season, he won his first race at Irwindale Speedway.

In 2016, Staropoli joined Young's Motorsports and SS-Green Light Racing for his NASCAR Camping World Truck Series debut at Homestead–Miami Speedway. He finished 31st after being involved in three incidents, including two spins, in the race.

Medical career
After graduating summa cum laude from Harvard University in 2012, Staropoli attended the University of Miami's Leonard M. Miller School of Medicine. He graduated Alpha Omega Alpha from Miami in May 2017 and entered a residency at Bascom Palmer Eye Institute in June 2018.

Motorsports career results

NASCAR
(key) (Bold – Pole position awarded by qualifying time. Italics – Pole position earned by points standings or practice time. * – Most laps led.)

Camping World Truck Series

K&N Pro Series East

K&N Pro Series West

ARCA Racing Series
(key) (Bold – Pole position awarded by qualifying time. Italics – Pole position earned by points standings or practice time. * – Most laps led.)

References

External links
 

1989 births
NASCAR drivers
ARCA Menards Series drivers
Living people
People from Plantation, Florida
Harvard University alumni
Leonard M. Miller School of Medicine alumni
American ophthalmologists
Racing drivers from Florida
Racing drivers from Miami
Sportspeople from Broward County, Florida